Merestinib (LY2801653) is an experimental cancer drug in development by Eli Lilly. It is a small molecule inhibitor of MET and several other receptor tyrosine kinases such as MST1R, FLT3, AXL, MERTK, TEK, ROS1, NTRK1/2/3, and DDR1/2.

Meristinib is part of a phase II clinical trial for advanced billiary tract cancer. The study is expected to be complete in April 2018. Phase II clinical trials for non-small cell lung cancer and solid tumors began in November 2016.

References

Experimental cancer drugs